The Grand Champions Polo Club is a polo club in Wellington, Florida.

Location
The club is located at 13444 Southfields Road in Wellington, Palm Beach County, Florida.

History
The club was established by Marc Ganzi and his wife, Melissa Ganzi. It is home to two professional teams: the Audio Polo Team and the Piaget Polo Team.

It hosts many polo tournaments every year. For example, in 2013, it hosted the USPA Fall Classic, the USPA Kay Colee Memorial, the US Trust Cup, the USPA Fall Plates, the Pedro Morrison Memorial, the Palm Restaurant Invitational, etc. Moreover, from 2010 to 2014, it hosted the annual International Gay Polo Tournament, organized by the Gay Polo League. On November 29, 2014, it hosted the North America Cup between Team USPA and Mexico.

References

External links
Official website

Polo clubs in the United States
Buildings and structures in Palm Beach County, Florida
Sports venues in Palm Beach County, Florida